Free Fire may refer to:

Free Fire, a 2016 British black comedy-action film
Free Fire (Video Game), a multiplayer online battle royale game
Free Fire, a novel by US author C. J. Box

Other uses

Free-fire zone, an area into which any weapon system may fire without additional coordination